Ralph Perry may refer to:

Ralph Barton Perry, American philosopher
Ralph Perry (poker player)